Charles Jennings Davis (December 29, 1910October 1, 1968) was an American politician who served on the Michigan House of Representatives from 1962 to 1968.

Early life 
Davis was born on December 29, 1910, in Eaton County, Michigan to parents Charles A. and Mable Davis. Davis graduated Mason High School.

Personal life 
Davis was a Baptist. Davis married Lenore Douglas, and together they had two children. Davis was a member of Knights of Pythias and Phi Kappa Phi.

Career 
Davis was a delegate to Michigan state constitutional convention from Ingham County 2nd District from 1961 to 1962, when Davis resigned. On March 19, 1962, Davis was sworn in to the Michigan House of Representatives from Ingham County 2nd District. On January 13, 1965, Davis was sworn in as the first state representative of the 59th district. Davis would serve in this position until 1968.

Death 
Davis died on October 1, 1968. Davis was interred at Greenwood Cemetery in Aurelius, Ingham County.

References 

1910 births
1968 deaths
People from Eaton County, Michigan
Olivet College alumni
Michigan State University alumni
Republican Party members of the Michigan House of Representatives
20th-century American politicians
Farmers from Michigan
Baptists from Michigan
Burials in Michigan
20th-century Baptists